The Double Diamond Individual Championship was a European Tour golf tournament which was played from 1974 to 1977. The event was a 36-hole strokeplay tournament which preceded the Double Diamond International team event, which was played later the same week. The tournament was officially titled as the Double Diamond Strokeplay in 1974 and 1975, and the Skol Lager Individual in its final year.

The 1977 Skol Lager Individual was played over the King's Course at Gleneagles in Scotland on 16 and 17 August. After the 36 holes, Nick Faldo, Craig Defoy and Chris Witcher were tied at 139. Faldo won a playoff at the first extra hole to claim his first European Tour title at the age of twenty.

Winners

Notes

References

External links
Coverage of the 1974 to 1976 events European Tour's official site
Coverage of the 1977 event on the European Tour's official site

Former European Tour events
Golf tournaments in Scotland
Defunct golf tournaments
Recurring sporting events established in 1974
Recurring sporting events disestablished in 1977
1974 establishments in Scotland
1977 disestablishments in Scotland